Stigmatochromis is a small genus of haplochromine cichlids that are endemic to Lake Malawi in East Africa.

Species
There are currently six recognized species in this genus:
 Stigmatochromis macrorhynchos Stauffer, Cleaver-Yoder & Konings, 2011
 Stigmatochromis melanchros Stauffer, Cleaver-Yoder & Konings, 2011
 Stigmatochromis modestus (Günther, 1894)
 Stigmatochromis pholidophorus (Trewavas, 1935) (Candle Hap)
 Stigmatochromis pleurospilus (Trewavas, 1935)
 Stigmatochromis woodi (Regan, 1922)

References

 
Haplochromini

Cichlid genera
Taxa named by Ethelwynn Trewavas
Taxonomy articles created by Polbot